James Yutaka Matsumoto Omura (November 17, 1912 – June 20, 1994) was the English language editor of the Rocky Shimpo newspaper in Denver, Colorado, during World War II.  He was an outspoken critic of the expulsion of people of Japanese ancestry from the west coast of the United States to concentration camps, following the Japanese attack on Pearl Harbor.  Subsequently, he became a vocal champion of the Nisei draft resisters, providing a 'substantial anchor' to the work of the Heart Mountain Fair Play Committee by publishing their grievances in the Rocky Shimpo.  At a time when the Japanese American Citizens League (JACL) preached passive conformity with the federal government as the best policy, Omura became the JACL's arch-enemy for counseling active resistance.

Childhood 
James Omura was born in Winslow, Bainbridge Island, in the state of Washington.  He was one of six children born to father Tsurumatsu Matsumoto and mother Harue (née Higashi).

When James was six, his mother became ill and returned to Japan with the three youngest children.  When the three older children were given the option of going to Japan with their mother, they chose to stay in the United States for fear they could never return.

Current Life 

James Omura was the editor and publisher of Current Life, based in San Francisco, CA, when he gave testimony before the Tolan Committee National Defense Migration Hearings before the Select Committee Investigating National Defense Migration on February 23, 1942.

Omura founded Current Life in October 1940 with his own income.  The objective of this magazine was to  present the Nisei fairly and justly, to counterbalance the propaganda of the Japanese newspapers and Japanese community.

Tolan Committee 

Following the Japanese attack on Pearl Harbor on December 7, 1941, the question of the loyalty of the Nisei to the United States had been a huge issue, culminating in the decision to incarcerate all persons of Japanese ancestry in American concentration camps.

Omura stated before the select committee of the 77th House of Representatives, that he was opposed to the mass incarceration of all American citizens of Japanese descent, based on inconclusive proof of their loyalty to the United States.

Rocky Shimpo 

On March 29, 1942, James Omura moved to Denver, Colorado during the removal of people of Japanese ancestry from the west coast of the United States.  Those who were unable to relocate were sent to hastily constructed 'Projects' known as War Relocation Centers (WRC) which served as way-stations for those who found residency elsewhere, but were concentration camps for the majority who could not find alternative accommodation.

At this Denver newspaper, Omura did yeoman service, by becoming the sole public voice of dissent for his community.

Expulsion of the Japanese race from the west coast states 

The Japanese American Citizens League (JACL) became the de facto leadership for people of Japanese ancestry, when the natural leaders, the Issei (first generation Japanese) parents were taken into custody by the U.S. government.  The Nisei (second generation, American citizens) took a stand in contradistinction to their Japanese non-citizen parents and conformed with the discriminatory policies of the leadership of the United States.

Omura published articles opposing this passive-aggressive stance of the JACL, for which he was singled-out as 'Public Enemy Number One of the JACL'.

Nisei draft resisters 

Hansen:  If you were to be asked to erect a hall of fame for Japanese Americans who, during the last fifty or sixty years, have made a mark that you can respect, who would be in that group for you?

Omura:  I admire the resisters a great deal, because of their courage and the firmness of their stand, and the fact they were willing to fight overwhelming odds, knowing that they had very little opportunity to win.  Because I always admire people who pursued noble endeavors or resisted overwheling odds, and so did these people.  This was wartime, conditions were all against them, but they had a belief in what they did.
In fact, the only Nisei draft resistance case favorable to the defendants came out of the Tule Lake Segregation Center, in Northern California.  Judge Louis Earl Goodman championed the 27 draft resisters of conscience and dismissed the case based on a due process violation of the U.S. Constitution.

Arrest 

James Omura was arrested on July 20, 1944, for conspiracy to counsel draft evasion.  Although a Wyoming grand jury indicted him, he was acquitted on November 1, 1944, on his first amendment right to free speech as a newspaperman.  Judge T. Blake Kennedy confessed to defense attorney Sidney Jacobs that if the defendant had been convicted by the jury, he would have sustained it, even  though he would be reversed by a higher court.

Exile 

During World War II, Japanese community opinion sided with the critical stand the Rocky Shimpo took toward the forced resettlement and the drafting of Nisei soldiers from the concentration camps. After the war, the Japanese community shifted their opinion in favor of the brave soldiers of the 100th Infantry Battalion and the 442nd Regimental Combat Team, in effect endorsing the position of the JACL - the organization which pushed for the drafting of the incarcerated Nisei.

Consequently, James Omura was exiled after the war by the Japanese community, until the 1980s, for having authored anti-JACL articles during the war.  Some may argue that James Omura is still in exile to this day for his marked absence from any exhibit (permanent or temporary) in the Japanese American National Museum in Los Angeles, California.

Awards 

In 1989 James Omura was awarded the Lifetime Achievement Award from the Asian American Journalists Association.
In 1994, James Omura received the Fighting Spirit Award from the Nikkei for Civil Rights and Redress (NCRR) (formerly, National Coalition for Redress/Reparations).

References

Further reading
  
 Hansen, Arthur A. Japanese American World War II Evacuation Oral History Project. Westport: Meckler, 1991.
 Hansen, Arthur A., and Betty Kulberg Mitson. Voices Long Silent: An Oral Inquiry into the Japanese American Evacuation. Fullerton: Japanese American Project, California State University, Fullerton Oral History Program, 1974.
 Chin, Frank. Born in the USA: A Story of Japanese America, 1889-1947. Lanham, Md: Rowman & Littlefield, 2002.

Interviews
 James M. Omura interview
 James M. Omura interview references
 James M. Omura interview index

External links
 Fighting Spirit Award
 James Omura Papers housed at Stanford Libraries

1994 deaths
1912 births
American writers of Japanese descent
People from Bainbridge Island, Washington
American male journalists
20th-century American journalists
American journalists of Asian descent
Journalists from Colorado
Journalists from Washington (state)